Mark L. Boitano (born July 19, 1953) is an American politician and real estate agent who served as a member of the New Mexico Senate for the 18th district from 1997 to 2012.

Early life and education 
Boitano was born in San Francisco and graduated from Bellarmine College Preparatory in San Jose, California. He earned a Bachelor of Science degree in political science from Regents College (now Excelsior University), in 1989.

Career 
Boitano was elected to the New Mexico Senate in 1996 and assumed office in 1997. Boitano did not seek re-election in 2012 and left office in January 2013. During his tenure, Boitano also served as ranking member of the Senate Corporations and Transportation Committee. Since 1992, Boitano has worked as a real estate broker.

Personal life 
Boitano's brother, Brian Boitano, is a retired Olympic figure skater.

References 

1953 births
Living people
Politicians from San Francisco
People from Albuquerque, New Mexico
Politicians from Albuquerque, New Mexico
Republican Party New Mexico state senators
Excelsior College alumni
Bellarmine College Preparatory alumni